Diplonemidae is a family of biflagellated unicellular protists that may be among the more diverse and common groups of planktonic organisms in the ocean. Although this family is currently made up of three named genera; Diplonema, Rhynchopus, and Hemistasia, there likely exist thousands of still unnamed genera. Organisms are generally colourless and oblong in shape, with two flagella emerging from a subapical pocket. They possess a large mitochondrial genome composed of fragmented linear DNA.  These non-coding sequences must be massively trans-spliced, making it one of the most complicated post-transcriptional editing process known to eukaryotes.

Etymology
The word “Diplonemidae” come from the Greek words ‘diplo’, meaning two, and ‘nemat’, meaning thread. Together, Diplonemidae roughly translates to ‘two threads’, likely referring to the characteristic two flagella of the organism.

History of Knowledge 
Primary studies done in the 1900s by Griessmann and Skuja had initially grouped Diplonemidae (or more specifically, the Diplonema and Rhynchopus taxa) with the euglenids. This was due to the two groups sharing many morphological similarities with the euglenids, such as metaboly, locomotion and a microtubule-reinforced feeding apparatus. However, this conclusion was met with some controversy, as diplonemids lacked characteristic features shared by all euglenids, such as possession of pellicle strips and paraxonemal rods on their flagella. Instead, they were placed in the euglenozoan phylum and shared this taxon with the kinetoplastids and euglenids. The inclusion of Rhynchopus and Diplonema in the family Diplonemidae was later confirmed through nuclear 18S rRNA analysis. As of now, Rhynchopus and diplonema are part of the ‘classical’ diplonemidae subgroup, whilst hemistasia is part of the ‘nonclassical’ diplonemidae subgroup.

Recently, there had been debates as to whether Diplonemidae were more closely related to the euglenids or kinetoplastids. It was not until analysis of cytosolic heat shock proteins that a sister relationship between the diplonemids and kinetoplastids was proposed. This was further supported through phylogenetic analysis, which discovered that diplonemidae possess a functional splice leader RNA that is characteristic of the kinetoplastids. Additionally, the amino acid tryptophan is encoded by codon TGA in kinetoplastids and diplonemids, whereas in euglenids, the regular codon is used instead.

Nevertheless, despite the similarities between kinetoplastids and diplonemids, the two taxa are still distinct form each other. Diplonemidae still lack a kinetoplast, and have a unique bi-flagellated trophic phase not seen in kinetoplastids. Presently, the kinetoplastids are regarded as the sister group to the Diplonemidae.

Although there are only three named genera within the Diplonemidae, environmental sequencing performed by the recent TARA Ocean Expedition concluded there are potentially thousands of genera, suggesting that pelagic Diplonemidae are the most diverse planktonic eukaryotes in the oceans.

Habitat and Ecology 
Although Diplonemidae are generally predators, some species display parasitic life strategies. Diplonemidae display a rich diversity in marine and freshwater environments, with their relative abundance increasing with depth. The diplonemids that exist in these different environments are genetically distinct, and exhibit slightly different lifestyles. The ‘classic’ diplonemids (i.e. Diplonema and Rhynchopus) are benthic, whereas the marine diplonemids, which include Hemistasia, are planktonic.

There are potentially thousands of unknown marine Diplonemidae species, with this diversity highly stratified in accordance to depth. Although molecular sequencing confirms the existence of these unnamed marine Diplonemidae, information regarding their morphology and lifestyle is absent. As marine Diplonemidae are the most abundant and genetically diverse protists (and potentially eukaryotes) in the sea, there are strong implications that they play a key role in aquatic ecosystems. As of now, this exact role is unknown.

Description of the Organism

Morphology and Anatomy 
Classical diplonemids (i.e. Diplonema and Rhynchopus), are colourless and oblong in shape. They are approximately 20 μm in length and possess a microtubule layer underneath their plasma membrane. Adjacent to it is a mitochondrion with discoidal cristae. They also possess two flagella of equal length, both of which lack paraxial rods. The two basal bodies originate from a subapical pocket, which merges with an adjacent feeding apparatus. This feeding apparatus is surrounded by many food vacuoles and reinforced by microtubules.

Nonclassical Diplonemidae (i.e. Hemistasia) are diverse in size but share many morphological aspects with the classic diplonemids. However, a great majority of these marine Diplonemidae have never been seen, with their existence only confirmed through molecular analysis.

Although Diplonemidae do not possess pellicular strips like Euglenids, they still move via metaboly.

Diplonemidae also exhibit the  compartmentalization of glycolytic and gluconeogenic enzymes into peroxisomes. These organelles are referred to as glycosomes, and is a characteristic feature also shared with their sister taxon, the kinetoplastids.

Life cycles 
Diplonemidae are capable of sexual reproduction, as genes involved in meiosis have been found. Although marine diplonemids appear to reproduce sexually, not much is known about Diplonemidae reproduction as Euglenozoans rarely demonstrate sexual processes.

Genetics 
Diplonemidae have a very unique mitochondrial DNA arrangement. Although Diplonemidae possess a large mitochondrial genome, these do not contain any intact full-sized genes. Instead, their mitochondrial DNA consists of linear gene fragments of different sizes. Because each fragment is both full of repeats and incomplete, individually they are unable to code for a gene themselves. Instead, fragments are transcribed and spliced together using their own specialized trans splicing machinery. Once spliced together, the transcript undergoes extensive editing to become recognizable RNA. This is accomplished by either Uracil-insertion, nucleotide deanimation, or substitution, which eventually generates a fully mature and translatable transcript.

The Diplonemidae genome contains a spliced leader RNA gene, which confirms their use of mRNA spliceosome-dependent trans splicing during nuclear expression.

Diplonemids possess the gap3 gene which is specifically found in cyanobacteria and Pseudomonadota. This is likely due to lateral gene transfer following the divergence of diplonemids from the Euglenoids. As to date, this is one of the most-supported examples of lateral gene transfer from a bacterium to eukaryote and may have implications for diplonemid acquisition of biochemical abilities.

Taxonomy
Although presently made up of less than a dozen named species, the existence of thousands of unknown Diplonemidae species has been confirmed.

 Genus Diplonema Griessmann 1913 non Don 1837
 D. aggregata Tashyreva et al. 2018
 D. ambulator Larsen & Patterson 1990
 D. breviciliata Griessman 1913
 D. japonica Tashyreva et al. 2018
 D. metabolica Larsen & Patterson 1990
 D. nigricans (Schuster, Goldstein & Hershenow 1968) Triemer & Ott 1990 [Isonema nigricans Schuster, Goldstein & Hershenow 1968]
 D. papillata (Porter 1973) Triemer & Ott 1990 [Isonema papillata Porter 1973]
 Genus Flectonema Tashyreva et al. 2018
 F. neradi Tashyreva et al. 2018
 Genus Lacrimia Tashyreva et al. 2018
 L. lanifica Tashyreva et al. 2018
 Genus Rhynchopus Skuja 1948 
 R. amitus Skuja 1948
 R. coscinodiscivorus Schnepf 1994
 R. euleeides Roy et al. 2007 
 R. humris Tashyreva et al. 2018
 R. littoralensis Kufferath 1950
 R. serpens Tashyreva et al. 2018
 Sulcionema  Tashyreva et al. 2018
 S. specki Tashyreva et al. 2018

References

Euglenozoa